The 1989 PBA All-Star Game is the first all-star weekend of the Philippine Basketball Association (PBA), coinciding the 1989 PBA season.

Background
PBA Commissioner Rudy Salud organized the league's first all-star game to showcase the younger players that have joined the league from 1988 and 1989, who became standouts in their respective teams against the veteran players, who are mostly in the league since its founding in 1975.

Before 1989, exhibition games were held in the provinces, notably in 1982, where the league's players from Luzon (named North All-Stars) were pitted against the league's players from Visayas and Mindanao (South All-Stars) in Cebu.

All-Star Game

Coaches
Dante Silverio of Formula Shell Zoom Masters and Baby Dalupan of Purefoods Hotdogs were selected as the head coaches of the Veterans' and Rookies-Sophomores teams respectively. Both coaches were at the helm during the Crispa-Toyota rivalry, where Silverio coached the Toyota Super Corollas and Dalupan coached the Crispa Redmanizers.

Rosters

Game

References

Philippine Basketball Association All-Star Weekend
All-Star Game